Humshakal is a 1992 Indian Hindi-language action film directed by Kalpataru. It stars Shammi Kapoor, Vinod Khanna and Meenakshi Seshadri in pivotal roles.

Plot

Commissioner Din Dayal Kapoor makes Dadu Kaliya take the place of his lookalike inspector Vinod, who was killed by Devi Dutt, but how long will he be able to hide the secret of Vinod's death from his family?

Cast
 Shammi Kapoor as Commissioner  Din Dayal Kapoor
 Vinod Khanna as Inspector Vinod / Sunil Kumar / Dadu Kaliya
 Meenakshi Seshadri as Sarah (Vinod's Wife)
 Kiran Juneja as Vicky (Sunil's Girlfriend)
 Kamini Kaushal as Sunil's Mother
 Nirupa Roy as Vinod's Mother
 Kader Khan as Devi Dutt
 Puneet Issar as Kundan
 Shafi Inamdar as Inspector Kulkarni 
 Sharat Saxena as Tony
 Bharat Bhushan as The Judge

Songs
"Jam Jam Ke Mar Sanam" - Kavita Krishnamurthy, Sudesh Bhosle
"Koi Baat Puchhe Bina" - Mohammed Aziz, Anuradha Paudwal
"Kuchh Na Socha Kuchh Na Dekha" - Kavita Krishnamurthy, Alka Yagnik
"Tere Dil Mein Rehna" - Mohammed Aziz, Anuradha Paudwal
"Pinky Meri Jaan Hai" - Mohammed Aziz, Kavita Krishnamurthy, Sonali Bajpayee

External links

1990s Hindi-language films
1992 films
Films scored by Laxmikant–Pyarelal
Films directed by Kalpataru